David Leslie Hawksworth  (born 1946 in Sheffield, UK) is a British mycologist and lichenologist currently with a professorship in the Universidad Complutense de Madrid in Madrid, Spain and also a Scientific Associate of The Natural History Museum in London. In 2002, he was honoured with an Acharius Medal by the International Association for Lichenology. He married Patricia Wiltshire, a leading forensic ecologist and palynologist in 2009. , he is the Editor-in-Chief of the journals IMA Fungus and Biodiversity and Conservation.

Selected publications

Articles

Books and monographs
 with Francis Rose: 
 with David J. Hill:

as editor
 with B. W. Ferry and M. S. Baddeley: 
 
 with Alan T. Bull: 
 with Alan T. Bull: 
 with Alan T. Bull: 
 with Alan T. Bull: 
 with Alan T. Bull:

See also
 :Category:Taxa named by David Leslie Hawksworth

References

Further reading

1946 births
Living people
Alumni of the University of Leicester
British mycologists
British lichenologists
Complutense University of Madrid alumni
Acharius Medal recipients
Commanders of the Order of the British Empire
Independent councillors in the United Kingdom
Presidents of the International Mycological Association